The Central District of Parsian County is a district (bakhsh) in Parsian County, Hormozgan Province, Iran. At the 2006 census, its population was 18,041, in 4,061 families.  The District has one city: Parsian. The District has two rural districts (dehestan): Buchir Rural District and Mehregan Rural District.

References 

Districts of Hormozgan Province
Parsian County